Solspiviridae is a family of RNA viruses, which infect prokaryotes.

Taxonomy 
Solspiviridae contains 24 genera:

 Alohrdovirus
 Andihavirus
 Dibaevirus
 Dilzevirus
 Eosonovirus
 Etdyvivirus
 Fahrmivirus
 Hinehbovirus
 Insbruvirus
 Intasivirus
 Jargovirus
 Mahshuvirus
 Mintinovirus
 Odiravirus
 Oekfovirus
 Puhrivirus
 Puirovirus
 Sexopuavirus
 Thiuhmevirus
 Tohkunevirus
 Tyrahlevirus
 Vendavirus
 Voulevirus
 Wishivirus

References 

Virus families
Riboviria